Howie Williams (born December 4, 1936 in Spartanburg, South Carolina) is a former professional American football player for the National Football League's Green Bay Packers and San Francisco 49ers, and for the American Football League's Oakland Raiders.

Career
Williams played for seven seasons and three different teams. As a rookie, he was on the Green Bay Packers when they beat the New York Giants 16–7 in the 1962 NFL Championship Game. He played only seven games for the team the following season before being sent to the San Francisco 49ers. The following year, he joined the Oakland Raiders, where he would spend the next six seasons, including three consecutive AFL title game appearances (1967, 1968, and 1969), along with an appearance in Super Bowl II. In his career, he had 14 interceptions for 240 yards in 95 games played.

See also
 List of American Football League players

1936 births
Living people
American football cornerbacks
American Football League players
American football safeties
Howard Bison football players
Green Bay Packers players
Oakland Raiders players
San Francisco 49ers players
Sportspeople from Spartanburg, South Carolina
Players of American football from South Carolina